Andrius Palionis (born 5 June 1975) is a Lithuanian politician. He served as Minister of Agriculture in the cabinet of Prime Minister Saulius Skvernelis from 7 August 2019 to 11 December 2020. He is affiliated with the Social Democratic Labour Party of Lithuania.

References 

Living people
1975 births
Place of birth missing (living people)
21st-century Lithuanian politicians
Ministers of Agriculture of Lithuania
Social Democratic Labour Party of Lithuania politicians